Temporary Release is a 2007 Danish comedy film written by, directed and starring Erik Clausen. It was entered into the 29th Moscow International Film Festival.

Cast
 Erik Clausen as John
 Jesper Asholt as Bo
 Ditte Gråbøl as Lisbeth
 Elith Nulle Nykjær as Sømmet (as Elith Nulle Nykjær Jørgensen)
 Anders Hove as Freddy
 Yüksel Akdag as Taxi Driver
 Jesper Rosenberg Antonsen as Fængselsbetjent
 Tim Brandt as Extra
 Henrik Bruhn as Kenneth
 Lilly Clausen as Johns mor
 Sami Darr as Samir
 Pil Egholm as Bettina

References

External links
 

2007 comedy films
2007 films
Danish comedy films
2000s Danish-language films
Films directed by Erik Clausen